Dermot Carlin is a Gaelic footballer for the Killyclogher St Mary's club and the Tyrone county team. He was a member of the squad that won the county's first All-Ireland Senior Football Championship in 2003. In the same year he was part of the Killyclogher team which captured the Tyrone Senior Football Championship for the first time. Carlin was also part of Tyrone's 2001 All-Ireland Minor Championship winning team.

In a very competitive era in Tyrone football, Carlin fought his way back onto the first team lineup by 2007.

He also has a very rich past in underage football, having represented Omagh CBS in the MacRory Cup, reaching the final two years in a row, Dermot was the captain sharing the trophy in 2001, due to the onset of foot-and-mouth disease.
Carlin represented the University of Ulster when he was a student there.

References

Year of birth missing (living people)
Living people
Killyclogher St Mary's Gaelic footballers
Tyrone inter-county Gaelic footballers